The Shadow of Saganami is a science fiction novel by American writer David Weber, published in 2004. Set in the Honorverse, it has been billed as the first in the Saganami Island series, spun off from the main Honor Harrington series. The book debuted at #16 on The New York Times best seller list for hardcover fiction.

It features Honor herself only in a cameo role: other characters from the novels and several short stories take centre stage. These include Helen Zilwicki, introduced in From the Highlands (after a cameo in The Short Victorious War), and Abigail Hearns, introduced in Ashes of Victory and also seen in The Service of the Sword.

Plot summary
The events of the novel are simultaneous with those of the novel At All Costs, which belongs to the main series of Honorverse novels.

The story focuses on the shakedown cruise of the Edward Saganami-C-class heavy cruiser HMS Hexapuma (nicknamed Nasty Kitty), commanded by Captain Aivars Terekhov, a war veteran and former prisoner of war who has only recently been cleared for return to active naval service. To the surprise of her new captain and crew, the Hexapuma, one of the Royal Manticoran Navy's most modern and powerful cruisers, is assigned to the Talbott Cluster, an impoverished group of star systems recently incorporated within the Star Kingdom of Manticore, and facing a vote of annexation. With the renewal of brutal war with Haven, and embroiled in the annexation of parts of the Silesian Confederacy, Manticore has no choice (and no other available resources) but to assign a small and clearly insufficient naval force to guard the Cluster, while a Constitutional Convention is taking place which will define the terms of the Cluster's formal annexation.

However, both the Solarian League's Office of Frontier Security (OFS) and corporations (which resents Manticore intervening in its "backyard") and the slaver world of Mesa do not want this to move forward and support indigenous groups violently opposed to annexation. The goal is to launch a terrorist campaign against Manticore, giving the League the excuse to intervene in the Cluster and expel the Star Kingdom.

The annexation is also stalled by the ruling oligarchs of many of the Cluster's systems, who fear that their power, wealth and influence will dilute once their worlds are absorbed within the Star Kingdom. In addition, the annexation is viewed with some distrust by vocal sectors of the Cluster's population, as it was sponsored by a powerful local merchant cartel with a history of strong-arming and abuse for its own purposes.

Hexapuma and her crew must patrol the Cluster's many systems to "show the flag" and assist the planetary governments, thus demonstrating Manticore's goodwill, while dealing politically with the various oligarchs and also supporting the convention efforts. On one side is Westman, a native of Montana, who manages to bomb several government facilities without causing a single casualty, and Nordbrant of Kornati, whose multi bomb attacks slaughter hundreds of civilians. Both groups are supplied by 'Firebrand', an intelligence officer of the OFS, who is attempting to destabilize the region so OFS forces can occupy the Cluster to "preserve regional peace." Eventually, President Tonkovic of Kornati, leader of the Constitutional Convention and one of the main holdouts to maintain her personal power, is impeached by her own government after it comes to light that her stalling almost resulted in Kornati's removal from the annexation effort, and the annexation moves forward.

Initially completely removed from the internal strife in order to avoid looking like invading oppressors, Hexapuma is tasked with pirate patrol. After stumbling across two pirate cruisers and a captured merchantman and tricking the cruisers into initiating the attack, she crushes the cruisers and manages to liberate the merchantman and its surviving crew, finding the pirates are former State Security personnel of the defunct Peoples Republic of Haven. The action cements Terekhov's abilities in the eyes of his crew and earns him copious goodwill from the people of the Talbott Cluster.

In the course of Hexapuma's patrolling, evidence begins to pile up indicating that the local terrorists are actually the unwitting pawns of foreign interests. They then stumble across an armed freighter of Mesa's Jessyk Combine in the process of delivering weapons to Westman. When Hexapuma sends a pinnace over to perform an inspection, one of the freighter's crew members panics and destroys the pinnace. After being decimated by Hexapuma's missile-defense lasers in response to the destruction of the pinnace, the surviving crew of the freighter surrender and give up the majority of the OFS's plan to occupy the Cluster.

After dealing with the local terrorist groups, Captain Terekhov and Hexapuma assemble an ad hoc squadron with other Manticoran ships in a mission to prevent the next step of the conspirators' plan: the service entry of a fleet of powerful ex-Solarian battlecruisers which have been transferred to Monica, an OFS proxy system to be used against Manticore. After dropping into the system, Terkhov demands the surrender of the local fleet until Manticore can validate the cruisers' authenticity, and that they're sovereign of Monica and not the OFS. Playing for time, the Monican Navy manages to lure the Manticoran Squadron into weapons range. After a brutal battle, half of Terekhovs squadron is destroyed or crippled, though the Monican Navy is destroyed in the process. After being relieved, and with the formal annexation well under way, Terekhov and Hexapuma return to Manticore and are greeted with a heroes welcome.

References

External links
 An excerpt of The Shadow of Saganami is available for download or reading online at Baen Books here.

Baen Books available as e-books
2004 science fiction novels
American science fiction novels
Novels by David Weber
Honorverse books
2004 American novels
Books with cover art by David Burroughs Mattingly